Karl Edler von Marinelli (baptized 12 September 1745, Vienna – 28 January 1803, Vienna) was an actor, theatre manager and playwright.

From 1761 Marinelli was a travelling comedian in the "Schultz Company" ("Schultzsche Gesellschaft") in Baden (Lower Austria), that was taken over a few years later by J. M. Menninger and played in Brno, Bratislava, Budapest and Vienna.

He was one of the founders of the genre of "Vienna Local Comedy"; ("Wiener Lokalposse"), and the author of several plays for the Schultz company. In 1780 he became head of the company, where J. J. La Roche performed most successfully as the "Punch" ("Kasperl"). He opened the first permanent popular theatre of Vienna with this troupe in the Theater in der Leopoldstadt (also known as "Kasperl Theater") in 1781.

At the same year the composer Ferdinand Kauer joined his company as leader of the orchestra and as conductor. Kauer composed plenty of music for Marinelli's theatre, including more than a hundred singspiels and operas: also incidental music and songs, mostly to texts by the house poet Karl Friedrich Hensler. Their first major success was Das Faustrecht in Thüringen (The Law of the Jungle in Thüringen, 1796–1797), which was eclipsed by the success of by Das Donauweibchen (1798), premiered two years later.

Works

 Der Ungar in Wien, 1773
 Der Bürger und der Soldat, 1773
 Der Schauspieler, 1774
 Der Geschmack in der Komödie ist unbestimmt, 1774
 Der Anfang muß empfehlen, 1774
 Das Findelkind, 1775 
 Die Überschwemmung, 1775
 Liebesgeschichte in Hirschau, 1780
 Aller Anfang ist schwer, 1781
 Don Juan oder Der steinerne Gast, 1783
 Die Reise ist nahe, oder Die dankbaren Schauspieler o. J.

1745 births
1803 deaths
Austrian male stage actors
Austrian male dramatists and playwrights
Austrian theatre directors
Austrian opera directors
Edlers of Austria
18th-century Austrian male actors
18th-century theatre managers